Věra Černá (born 17 May 1963 in Brno) is a former Czech artistic gymnast. She won the balance beam title at the 1979 World Championships.

Competitive history

References

1963 births
Living people
Czechoslovak female artistic gymnasts
Medalists at the World Artistic Gymnastics Championships
World champion gymnasts
Sportspeople from Brno